Derrick Offei-Awuku (born 1993) in Tema, better known professionally as Offei is a Ghanaian singer, guitarist, songwriter and philanthropist. Offei is popularly known for his hit single, 'Fi Mano' which features Nigerian reggae-dancehall singer, Patoranking.

Early life
Born to Ghanaian parents, Offei hails from the Eastern Region of Ghana. He received high school education at Tema Senior High School and proceeded to study Medical Laboratory Science at the University of Ghana, Legon.

Career
Offei has been doing music actively since releasing his debut single "Let It Go" in 2017 which gave the world a dose of his silky vocal prowess. He has consistently released successive singles, including; "Communication", "Humanbeing" featuring Kwesi Arthur, "Body Whine", "LowKey", "Maria", "Santorini", "Fi Mano", among others. Each of these songs has enjoyed immense radio plays and has been part of credible playlists on all digital platforms across the world. In 2019, Offei signed a label management deal with US-based music company, Dwoods Productions.

Discography

Awards and nominations

References

External links
Offei on Facebook
Offei on Twitter
Offei on Instagram

1993 births
Living people